Sinking cities are urban environments that are in danger of disappearing due to their rapidly changing landscapes. The largest contributors to these cities becoming unlivable are the combined effects of climate change (manifested through sea level rise, intensifying storms, and storm surge), land subsidence, and accelerated urbanization. Many of the world's largest and most rapidly growing cities are located along rivers and coasts, exposing them to natural disasters. As countries continue to invest people, assets, and infrastructure into these cities, the loss potential in these areas also increases. Sinking cities must overcome substantial barriers to properly prepare for today's dynamic environmental climate.

Background and history

Development 
The fundamental conditions that gave rise to ancient cities, like Mesopotamia, have long been debated by scholars. A number of theories have been presented, and to date, there is insufficient evidence to support a single root cause which led to the formation of cities. Agriculture, increased economic productivity, and superior social organization are often cited as key contributing factors that gave rise to these ancient cities, although there likely were other factors at play. Today, similar forces continue to be drivers behind the urbanization of the global population.

The vast majority of sinking cities are located in coastal lowlands. These areas are particularly vulnerable to climate related hazards, but since ancient times, have also been preferred areas for human settlement. Soil fertility, availability of fresh water from rivers, accessibility due to flat topographical relief, and sea and waterways allowing for trade routes, have long made coastal plains valuable agricultural and economic resources. Throughout history, these areas have continued to develop, and today, are some of the most densely populated regions in the world.

Causes 
The growing physical risks to many coastal cities stem from a combination of factors relating to rapid urbanization, climate change, and land subsidence. Many of these natural hazards are largely anthropogenic in origin. In many cases, the fundamental aspects that lead to sinking cities become tightly interwoven, and over time, are increasingly difficult to resolve.

Urbanization 

For the first time in human history the majority of people live in urban areas. The United Nations estimates that approximately 68% of the world's population will be living in urban areas by 2050. Urbanization has vast implications including the urban planning, geography, sociology, architecture, economics, and public health of a region. The rate at which urbanization occurs is also important. Slower rates of urbanization allow city planners time to make thoughtful planning decisions. Once cities reach maturity, it can take decades for local governments to develop, fund, and execute major infrastructure projects to alleviate the issues brought on by rapid urbanization.

In particular, some regions in Asia are currently experiencing unprecedented urban growth. Currently, the Asian urban population is increasing by 140,000 per day and is expected to nearly double from 1.25 billion in 2006 to 2.4 billion by 2030. The more troubling fact is that much of this growth is taking place along the coasts. In China, population growth in urban coastal locations was three times the national growth rate. Rapid increases in population growth challenge the carrying capacity of these urban environments often leading to mismanagement of natural resources. For sinking cities, the most common result has been over-extraction of groundwater ultimately resulting in land subsidence.

Climate change

Low-lying cities are especially prone to the most devastating effects of climate change. The risks posed by climate change will continue to grow into the next century, even if a dramatic reduction in greenhouse gas emissions is achieved, due to the built-in momentum from previous emissions. Moreover, recent reports by the United Nations have shown that climate change may be accelerating rather than slowing down. The 2019 Emissions Gap Report confirmed that GHG emissions continue to rise, despite highly publicized political commitments. The report goes on to emphasize that countries must increase their Intended Nationally Determined Contributions threefold to remain below the 2 °C goal and more than fivefold to achieve the 1.5 °C goal.

Coastal cities will bear the largest impacts of climate change due to their proximity to the sea. Storm surges and high tides could combine with sea level rise and land subsidence to further increase flooding in many regions. Oftentimes even recently completed infrastructure projects have not properly accounted for the rapidly changing climate. Asia's coastal megacities are particularly at risk as certain cities' flood protection measures have been cited as inadequate even for 30-year flood events.

Sea level rise
Although reports vary widely in predicting the height of sea level rise in the future, IPCC estimates predict a 1-meter rise over the next century. Other reports consider the IPCC estimates to be far too low and suggest levels closer to 1.9 meters by 2100. Nevertheless, sea level rise is an unavoidable reality. As sea levels continue to rise, coastal cities face challenges of properly modeling and preparing for the increased storm surges brought on by tropical storms.

Intensifying storms
Risks due to sea level rise will only be compounded by intensifying storms. As the oceans continue to warm, tropical cyclone rainfall rates and cyclone intensities are likely to increase. Studies conducted by the NOAA also suggest a 2 °C increase in global temperatures will lead to a greater proportion of tropical storms that reach Category 4 and Category 5 levels. Hurricane Sandy (2012), which was only a Category 3 storm, inflicted nearly 70 billion USD in damages. Additionally, climate change may cause a change in the paths of tropical cyclones, bringing storms to places which have previously not had to contend with major hurricanes. These vulnerable areas are likely to be unaware and ill-prepared for the ever intensifying storms.

Land subsidence

Subsidence is the sudden sinking or gradual downward settling of the ground's surface with little or no horizontal motion. Land subsidence can have both direct and indirect repercussions for cities. Direct impacts are often in the form of structural damage to major infrastructure systems, including water management networks, buildings, and highways. Land subsidence also further adds to the growing risk of coastal flooding, and oftentimes, the net rate of subsidence exceeds that of sea level rise. In Bangkok, the Gulf of Thailand is rising 0.25 cm per year, but the city is sinking at a far faster rate, up to 4 cm per year. This downward settlement significantly increases flood vulnerability which can ultimately lead to major economic damages and loss of lives.

Causes 

Throughout the twenty-first century, as these cities continued to grow, fresh water became an ever more precious resource. Due to the dense populations along river deltas, industrial development, and relaxed or no environmental protections, river waters often became polluted. This has become an ever more common phenomena in coastal mega-cities, particularly in Asia. Many cities are unable to afford costly water treatment systems and are forced to rely heavily on groundwater. When groundwater is extracted from aquifers in the subsurface more rapidly than it is able to recharge, voids are created beneath the earth. As the ground is loaded, most often through increased development, the soil compresses and land begins to subside. Depending on the geology of the region, subsidence may occur rapidly, as in many coastal plains, or more slowly if large bedrock exists in a region.

Examples 
Venice is often referenced as an example of a city suffering from subsidence, however, it is a relatively minor case with mostly historical origins. More serious, are the Asian metropolises with concentrations of millions of people living at or even below mean sea level. Some cities, such as Tokyo, have developed sophisticated techniques for measuring, monitoring, and combating land subsidence. But many other large cities (Hanoi, Haiphong, Rangoon, Manila, etc.), particularly in developing nations, have no record of their subsidence, which is far from under control. Many cities do not possess the resources necessary to conduct complex, and often expensive, geological, geotechnical, and hydrogeological studies required to accurately measure and model future land subsidence.

Mexico City is an example of a sinking city that is neither coastal nor low-lying. The city was originally constructed by the Aztecs above a large aquifer in the 1300s. Subsidence was originally caused by the loading of large Aztec and Spanish structures. The city grew rapidly during the nineteenth century, and with it, so did the demand for water. By 1854 more than 140 wells had been drilled into the aquifer beneath Mexico City. Although the early cultures drew water from the same lakes and aquifers, they were merely 300,000 people as compared to the city's current population of 21 million. Today, the historic and densely populated city is rapidly sinking at varying rates between 15 – 46 cm/year. The city is also currently plagued with water shortage issues emphasizing a common positive feedback loop that exists within sinking cities.

Impacts

Economic
As cities continue to grow, fueled by global urbanization, countries will continue to invest additional resources to accommodate the growing populations. Every day, sinking cities are becoming increasingly vulnerable to natural disasters, many of which are critical components of their national economies, and some, of the global economy. While natural catastrophes cause average economic losses between US$60–100 billion annually, a single large-scale disaster can easily surpass this, as proven by Hurricanes Sandy and Maria. Numerous sinking cities throughout the world are becoming ever more exposed to natural disasters, many of which, do not have the financial means to prepare for the impending storms.

In July and August, floods at high tide often near the subway level in Mumbai, clearly indicative of the impending climate dangers. One study put the cost to Mumbai of a 1-meter sea level rise at US$71 billion. Ho Chi Minh City currently accounts for 40% of Vietnam's GDP and has become especially vulnerable due to rising sea levels, land subsidence, and continued urbanization. Bangkok is also highly exposed to river flooding, as a major storm could have potentially massive impacts to the national economy. This was confirmed in 2011 when the Chao Phraya River flooded and losses amounted to around 10% of Thailand's GDP.

Although many US cities are less exposed and better equipped to handle the impacts of climate change, in some cases, US cities are especially susceptible in terms of economic risk. In a study conducted by Zillow, the real estate firm found that a combined $882 billion worth of real estate would be underwater if sea level were to rise by six feet. Furthermore, the estimate only accounts for sea level rise and doesn't consider the possibility of major storms or land subsidence. New York City alone accounts for approximately 8% of the United States GDP and has experienced costly storms within the past decade. Megaprojects, like The BIG U (NYC), have been proposed to help protect against future super storms and long-term sea level rise. However, major questions are being raised regarding the project's effectiveness and social responsibility.

Social and ethical
Asian urbanization will be accompanied by a significant increase in the number of urban poor as migrants continue to move to cities in hopes of economic prosperity. One report by OECD examined the vulnerability of 130 major port cities to climate change and found that by 2070 approximately half of the total population threatened by coastal flooding would reside in just ten megacities, all but one located in Asia. Another report analyzed the 616 largest metropolitan areas home to 1.7 billion people and cover approximately US$34,000 billion of global GDP. The study found that flood risk threatens more people than any other natural catastrophe.

The urban poor will bear a disproportionate burden of climate change risk as they are likely to settle in areas most prone to flooding. This has also been seen in many US cities as low income housing is typically situated in the flood zones. Hurricane Katrina, in New Orleans, disproportionately impacted low income and minority communities as the wealthiest communities are situated above sea level, and thus, further protected from major storms. Highly impacted areas, such as Orleans Parish and the 9th Ward, predominately contain minority communities and therefore the impacts are unevenly dispersed.

In other countries, environmental refugees have become a particularly difficult problem for governments. In Bangladesh, rising sea levels and resulting floods have caused many people to flee to cities in India. In the coming decades, as impending storms begin to damage large sinking cities, environmental refugees are likely to become a global phenomena.

Political
Sinking cities have even led some nations to make drastic political changes. Jakarta, the capital of Indonesia, is home to 10 million people and is one of the fastest sinking cities in the world. Almost half the city sits below sea level, and some researchers believe if the subsidence issues continue to go unchecked parts of the city will be entirely submerged by 2050. Jakarta's environmental issues have become so dire that the Indonesian government has proposed the capital be moved from Jakarta to a yet-to-be-built city in Kalimantan in Borneo. The move hopes to ease some of the inequality and growing population issues on Jakarta by relocating a large portion of the population to the new capital. The controversial move is not unprecedented, but is likely one of the first capital relocations to be driven by environmental forces.

Policy development
In many cases, urban officials have been unable to manage the challenges associated with sinking cities. Although every city has specific issues, the following are common general barriers to urban adaptation:
 Urban officials' lack of awareness regarding the magnitude and vulnerability of coastal flooding risk
 The need to cope with immediate problems such as housing, transportation, and poverty
 Financial constraints which limit infrastructure upgrades
 Governance issues

Mitigation 
The first step in mitigating the risks associated with sinking cities is raising awareness among citizens and city officials. Some of the vulnerabilities of sinking cities are unable to be controlled by engineering projects like climate change, so it is essential that urban officials are aware of the risks and vulnerabilities posed on their region. This starts by conducting local and regional assessments that analyze city-level flood risks and culminates in creating a long term resiliency plan for cities. At this stage, climate change can no longer be mitigated. International goals hope to reduce its impact throughout the twenty-first century, however, cities must design with climate adaptability in mind.

Land subsidence
Other components of sinking cities are within the control of urban officials and can be successfully mitigated. The first step toward a successful subsidence mitigation strategy is measuring and understanding its root causes. Many different techniques are used today including optical leveling, GPS surveys, LIDAR, and InSAR satellite imagery. Ideally, a combination of techniques will be used to conduct the initial studies. Many cities have successfully implemented policies to reduce subsidence. In Tokyo, groundwater regulations were implemented in the early 1960s, and ten years later, subsidence came to a halt. Shanghai is another example of a city that successfully implemented a subsidence mitigation strategy. Shanghai implemented an active recharge technique which actively pumps an equal amount of water back into the subsurface as water is extracted. Assuming the pumping rates are in balance with the recharge rates, this has been proven to be a successful strategy.

Adaptation
For many sinking cities, adaptation is a more realistic strategy as many of the feedback loops associated with urbanization are too strong to overcome. For most sinking cities, the largest challenge associated with adaptation often becomes cost. The cost of adaptation to climate change required by developing countries, mostly in Asia, is estimated by the World Bank at US$75–100 billion per annum. However, the United Nations adaptation fund remains pitifully under-resourced at US$18 million. For many countries, foreign assistance will be necessary to fund large adaptation projects.

A major component of adapting to climate change is the installation of flood protections, warning systems/evacuation planning, and land use and spatial planning. Construction of large seawalls, dikes, and diversion channels, are underway in many cities, but these solutions often only limit damage and must be combined with warning systems and evacuation plans. Warning systems and evacuation plans are likely the only response in coping with large-scale disasters to avoid significant loss of life. However, as seen during Hurricane Katrina, evacuation is not easily executed, as residents are often unwilling to abandon their unprotected property.

As previously discussed, flood risk remains the largest natural risk to sinking cities throughout the world. The need to regulate land use to reduce exposure to flood risk should be the highest priority of many governments. The Netherlands has implemented a country-wide program coined the "Room for the River" Programme, which aims to give the river more room to be able to manage higher water levels throughout the country. By allowing buffer space for rivers that flood naturally, sinking cities can reduce the risk of floods that impact the established built environment.

Largest potential sinking cities

See also

References

Coastal geography
Effects of climate change
Sea level